Vinetopterus is a genus of prehistoric eurypterid from the Devonian period in Europe classified as part of the Moselopteridae family. The genus contains two species, both from Germany: V. struvei and V. martini.

See also 
 List of eurypterids

References 

Eurypterina
Devonian eurypterids
Devonian arthropods of Europe
Eurypterids of Europe